Hussein Abdallah al-Araj is a Palestinian former mayor and government minister. He was the acting mayor of Nablus, one of the largest cities in the West Bank. He was in office, heading a local government committee, from April 2004 to April 2005. He was succeeded by another local government committee led by Ghassan Hammouz. Al-Araj was also the Palestinian National Authority's Deputy Minister of Local Government in 2004-05.

In 2005, he complained that Nablus was closed off by the Israel Defense Forces for three years and concerning the Israeli West Bank barrier, he stated "Walls don't build peace, we learned that in Berlin... face to face contact do [build peace]."

References

Living people
Mayors of Nablus
Year of birth missing (living people)
Governors of Hebron Governorate
Government ministers of the State of Palestine
Academic staff of An-Najah National University
Alumni of the University of Glasgow
Roosevelt University alumni
University of Jordan alumni
People from Jenin Governorate